Carol Hannah Whitfield is an American fashion designer. In August 2009, she participated in the reality show Project Runway and received the third place prize. She is now focusing her work on bridesmaid gowns and wedding gown collections, and founded her eponymous label.

References

Year of birth missing (living people)
Place of birth missing (living people)
Living people
American fashion designers
American women fashion designers
Project Runway (American series) participants
People from Charleston, South Carolina
College of Charleston alumni
21st-century American women